Codex Nitriensis, designated by R or 027 (in the Gregory-Aland numbering), ε 22 (von Soden), is a 6th-century Greek New Testament codex containing the Gospel of Luke, in a fragmentary condition.

Description 
The text is written in two columns per page, 25 lines per page, in large uncial letters. It has no breathings and accents. The letters are similar to those of codices 081, 022, and 024, only that they are somewhat irregular and straggling.

It is a palimpsest. The upper text contains the Syriac treatise Severus of Antioch against Johannes Grammaticus written in the 8th or 9th century. The lower text of the same manuscript contains the Iliad and the Gospel of Luke, both of the sixth century, and the Euclid's Elements of the seventh or eighth century.

Contents 

Gospel of Luke 1:1-13, 1:69-2:4, 2:16-27, 4:38-5:5, 5:25-6:8, 6:18-36, 6:39, 6:49-7:22, 7:44, 7:46, 7:47, 7:50, 8:1-3, 8:5-15, 8:25-9:1, 9:12-43, 10:3-16, 11:5-27, 12:4-15, 12:40-52, 13:26-14:1, 14:12-15:1, 15:13-16:16, 17:21-18:10, 18:22-20:20, 20:33-47, 21:12-22:6, 22:8-15, 22:42-56, 22:71-23:11, 23:38-51.

Text of the codex 
The Greek text of the codex is a representative of the Byzantine text-type in a very early stage, with a large portion of non-Byzantine readings. Aland gave for it the following textual profile - 111 41/2 02 5s. Aland placed it in Category V. According to the Claremont Profile Method it belongs to the textual family Kx in Luke 1 and Luke 10; in Luke 20 it has mixed text.

It lacks the text of Luke 22:43-44.

History 
Formerly it belonged to the monastery of St. Mary Deipara in the Nitrian Desert. In 1847 along with the other 550 manuscripts (e.g. British Library, Add MS 14448) it was brought to England by Henry Tattam.

The fragments of Luke were independently transcribed, both by Tregelles in 1854, and by Tischendorf in 1855, who afterwards re-examined the places wherein he differed from Tregelles (e.g. Luke 8:5; 18:1.10).
Tischendorf edited the text of the codex in 1857 in his Monumenta sacra inedita, volume VII, with a facsimile.

The 48 extant parchment leaves of the manuscript are kept in the British Library (Add MS 17211) in London.

See also 

 List of New Testament uncials
 Biblical manuscript
 Textual criticism

References

Further reading 
 
 S. P. Tregelles, An Introduction to the Critical study and Knowledge of the Holy Scriptures, London 1856, pp. 183–184.
 C. v. Tischendorf, "Monumenta sarca inedita" II (Leipzig, 1857), pp. XIV-XXII, 1-92.
 Heiberg, J. L., Ein palimpsest der Elemente Euklids, in: Philologus 45 vol., 1885, pp. 353–366.

External links 

 Codex Nitriensis R (027) at the Encyclopedia of Textual Criticism
 Add MS 17211 at the British Library

6th-century biblical manuscripts
1847 archaeological discoveries
Nitriensis
Palimpsests
Manuscripts of the Iliad
British Library additional manuscripts
Gospel of Luke